The National Smoker's Alliance (NSA) was an organization formed in 1993 to protest against anti-smoking legislation in the United States. The NSA was a public relations group created and funded by the tobacco industry, which operated nationally from 1994 to 1999 to advocate for adults using tobacco products without vigorous regulation or increased tobacco taxes.  An early example of astroturfing, the NSA employed stealth marketing tactics to give the appearance of grassroots opposition to anti-smoking laws.

One of the NSA's members included famed talk show host Morton Downey, Jr.; however, he gave up smoking after being diagnosed with lung cancer in 1996 (and in doing so reversed his smoking stance to an anti-smoking one); he died of the disease in 2001.

In 1999 tobacco company Philip Morris announced that it would withdraw funding after the NSA made an ethics complaint about John McCain.

References

External links
 National Smokers Alliance, The Voice of Reason, ca. October, 1993.  Pamphlet-manifesto.
 Myron Levin, Smoker Group's Thick Wallet Raises Questions. Los Angeles Times. March 29, 1998.  Retrieved April 22, 2011.

Business organizations based in the United States
Tobacco control
Smoking in the United States